Aqa Gol (also Romanized as Āqā Gol) is a village in Yeylaq Rural District, in the Central District of Buin va Miandasht County, Isfahan Province, Iran. At the 2006 census, its population was 389, in 71 families.

References 

Populated places in Buin va Miandasht County